The Nigeria women's national football team has represented Nigeria at the FIFA Women's World Cup at all eight stagings of the tournament, one of seven teams to do so. Despite the rich history, however, Nigeria's successes have been rather modest, only progressed to the knockout phase in just two occasions.

FIFA Women's World Cup record

Record by opponent

1991 FIFA Women's World Cup

Group C

1995 FIFA Women's World Cup

Group B

1999 FIFA Women's World Cup

Group A

Quarterfinals

2003 FIFA Women's World Cup

Group A

2007 FIFA Women's World Cup

Group B

2011 FIFA Women's World Cup

Group A

2015 FIFA Women's World Cup

Group D

2019 FIFA Women's World Cup

Group A

Round of 16

2023 FIFA Women's World Cup

Group B

Goalscorers

References

 
Countries at the FIFA Women's World Cup